Paper Anniversary is the third album by Canadian folk-pop singer Christine Fellows, released in 2005 on Six Shooter Records.

Track listing

 "Foreword"
 "Vertebrae"
 "Road Trip"
 "Migrations"
 "Face Down, Feet First"
 "Instructions on How to Dissect a Ground Owl"
 "Paper Anniversary"
 "Souvenirs"
 "Double Takes"
 "We Two"
 "Phantom Pains"
 "Departures/Arrivals"
 "Paper Anniversary (Reprise)"
 "Afterword"

References

2005 albums
Christine Fellows albums
Six Shooter Records albums